James Burgoyne (born 21 February 1980) is a former English cricketer. Burgoyne was a right-handed batsman who bowled right-arm medium pace. He was born at Wordsley, Worcestershire.

Burgoyne represented the Worcestershire Cricket Board in a single List A match against the Kent Cricket Board in the 1999 NatWest Trophy.  In his only List A match, he took one wicket at a cost of 46 runs.

References

External links
James Burgoyne at Cricinfo
James Burgoyne at CricketArchive

1980 births
Living people
People from Wordsley
Sportspeople from Stourbridge
English cricketers
Worcestershire Cricket Board cricketers